Marty McDowell (born 16 January 1987) is a New Zealand canoeist.

He is representing New Zealand at the 2016 Summer Olympics, in the K1 1000 event.

References

External links
 
 

1987 births
Living people
Olympic canoeists of New Zealand
Canoeists at the 2016 Summer Olympics
New Zealand male canoeists